Döwletmyrat Ataýew (born March 16, 1983) is a professional Turkmen football player whose last known club was Shurtan Guzar.

Career statistics

International career statistics

Goals for Senior National Team

References

External links

Turkmenistan footballers
Living people
1983 births
Navbahor Namangan players
FC Shurtan Guzar players
FC Aşgabat players
FK Karvan players
Turkmenistan expatriate footballers
Expatriate footballers in Uzbekistan
Turkmenistan expatriate sportspeople in Uzbekistan
Expatriate footballers in Azerbaijan
Turkmenistan expatriate sportspeople in Azerbaijan
Turkmenistan international footballers
Association football forwards